Rahimabad may refer to:

Iran

Chaharmahal and Bakhtiari Province
Rahimabad, Kiar, a village in Kiar County
Rahimabad, Lordegan, a village in Lordegan County

Fars Province
Rahimabad, Arsanjan, a village in Arsanjan County
Rahimabad, Fasa, a village in Fasa County
Rahimabad, Neyriz, a village in Neyriz County
Rahimabad, Pasargad, a village in Pasargad County

Gilan Province
Rahimabad, Iran, a city in Gilan Province, Iran
Rahimabad, Lahijan, a village in Lahijan County
Rahimabad District, an administrative subdivision of Gilan Province, Iran
Rahimabad Rural District, an administrative subdivision of Gilan Province, Iran

Golestan Province
Rahimabad, Golestan, a village in Azadshahr County

Hamadan Province
Rahimabad, Hamadan, a village in Hamadan County

Hormozgan Province
Rahimabad, Hormozgan, a village in Hajjiabad County

Isfahan Province
Rahimabad, Falavarjan, a village in Falavarjan County
Rahimabad, Isfahan, a village in Isfahan County
Rahimabad, Baraan-e Shomali, a village in Isfahan County

Kerman Province
Rahimabad, Arzuiyeh, a village in Arzuiyeh County
Rahimabad-e Mowtowr Hoseyn Hatami, a village in Arzuiyeh County
Rahimabad, Chatrud, a village in Kerman County
Rahimabad, Rafsanjan, a village in Rafsanjan County

Kermanshah Province
Rahimabad, Dorudfaraman, a village in Kermanshah County
Rahimabad, Miyan Darband, a village in Kermanshah County
Rahimabad-e Olya, a village in Kermanshah County
Rahimabad-e Sofla, a village in Kermanshah County

Khuzestan Province
Rahimabad, Khuzestan, a village in Andika County

Kurdistan Province
Rahimabad, Kurdistan, a village in Saqqez County

Lorestan Province
Rahimabad, Borujerd, a village in Lorestan Province, Iran
Rahimabad, Pol-e Dokhtar, a village in Lorestan Province, Iran
Rahimabad, alternate name of Shirvan, Lorestan, a village in Lorestan Province, Iran
Rahimabad 1, a village in Lorestan Province, Iran
Rahimabad 2, a village in Lorestan Province, Iran
Rahimabad 3, a village in Lorestan Province, Iran

Markazi Province
Rahimabad, former name of Parandak, a city in Markazi Province, Iran

North Khorasan Province
Rahimabad, Esfarayen, a village in Esfarayen County, North Khorasan Province, Iran
Rahimabad, Shirvan, a village in Shirvan County, North Khorasan Province, Iran

Qazvin Province
Rahimabad, Buin Zahra, a village in Qazvin Province, Iran
Rahimabad, Takestan,  a village in Qazvin Province, Iran

Razavi Khorasan Province
Rahimabad, Darbqazi, a village in Nishapur County
Rahimabad, Rivand, a village in Nishapur County
Rahimabad (Kuhsabad), Rivand, a village in Nishapur County
Rahimabad, Torbat-e Jam, a village in Torbat-e Jam County
Rahimabad, Salehabad, a village in Torbat-e Jam County

Sistan and Baluchestan Province
Rahimabad, Khash, a village in Khash County

South Khorasan Province
Rahimabad, South Khorasan, a villate in Tabas County
Rahimabad-e Lanu, a village in South Khorasan Province, Iran

Tehran Province
Rahimabad, Tehran, a village in Tehran Province, Iran

West Azerbaijan Province
Rahimabad, Urmia, a village in Urmia County
Rahimabad, Nazlu, a village in Urmia County

Yazd Province
Rahimabad, Abarkuh, a village in Abarkuh County
Rahimabad, Behabad, a village in Behabad County
Rahimabad, Garizat, a village in Taft County

Pakistan
Rahimabad, Gilgit-Baltistan, a hill station in Nagar district
Rahimabad, Pakistan, a village in Rahim Yar Khan District